The Inspector General Act of 1978 is a United States federal law defining a standard set of Inspector General offices across several specified departments of the U.S. federal government.

The Act specifically creates Inspector General positions and offices in more than a dozen specific departments and agencies.    The Act gave these inspectors general the authority to review the internal documents of their departments or offices. They were given responsibility to investigate fraud, to give policy advice (section 4), to handle certain complaints by employees, and to report to the heads of their agencies and to Congress on their activities every six months (section 5).

Many existing offices with names like Office of Audit, Office of Investigations, or similar were transferred, renamed, folded into the new IG offices.

The core of the law is in Section 3a: "There shall be at the head of each Office an Inspector General who shall be appointed by the President, without regard to political affiliation and solely on the basis of integrity and demonstrated ability in accounting, auditing, financial analysis, law, management analysis, public administration, or investigations. Each Inspector General shall report to and be under the general supervision of the head of the establishment involved or, to the extent such authority is delegated, the officer next in rank below such head, but shall not report to, or be subject to supervision by, any other officer of such establishment. Neither the head of the establishment nor the officer next in rank below such head shall prevent or prohibit the Inspector General from initiating, carrying out, or completing any audit or investigation, or from issuing any subpoena during the course of any audit or investigation."

The Act and the Inspector General role were amended thirty years later by the Inspector General Reform Act of 2008, which created the umbrella IG agency, Council of the Inspectors General on Integrity and Efficiency (CIGIE).

In May 2020, after a series of IG firings for questionable causes, several House Democrats introduced a bill, H.R.6984, to amend the original act to protect against political retaliation and require just cause for IG dismissal.

References

External links

1978 in law
United States federal government administration legislation
 Inspector General Act of 1978